Located in northwest-central Alberta, the Peace River oil sands deposit is the smallest of four large deposits of oil sands of the Western Canadian Sedimentary Basin formation.

The Peace River oil sands lie, generally, in the watershed of the Peace River.

The Peace River oil sands deposits are the smallest in the province. The largest, the Athabasca oil sands, are located to the east, the second largest the, Cold Lake oil sands deposit is south of Athabaska and the Wabasco oil sands are south of Athabaska and usually linked to it. In 2007 the World Energy Council estimated that these oil sands areas contained at least two-thirds of the world's discovered bitumen in place at the time, with an original oil-in-place (OOIP) reserve of  (1.6 trn barrels), an amount comparable to the total world reserves of conventional oil.

Whereas the Athabasca oil sands lie close enough to the surface that the sand can be scooped up in open-pit mines, and brought to a central location for processing, the Peace River deposits are considered too deep, and are exploited in situ using steam-assisted gravity drainage (SAGD) and Cold Heavy Oil Production with Sand (CHOPS).

History 

By 1973 the importance of the Alberta oil sands was already realized as an enormous back up supply but was considered to be the second line of defence in comparison to the oil shales of western Colorado and parts of Utah and Wyoming. The Peace River oil deposits production followed technological advances. In 1977 Strausz published his article on the chemistry of the oil sands, then also known as the tar sands attending the conference in that year entitled the Symposium on Tar Sand and Oil Shale.

By 2003 with the rising price of oil, and the improvement of enhanced recovery techniques such as thermal in-situ methods, the Peace River oil sands had become much more viable. Capital expenditure increased between 2006 and 2015 totalling $125 billion in all oil sands projects leading to a severe labor shortage in Alberta and driven unemployment rates to their lowest level in history – the lowest of all 10 Canadian provinces and 50 U.S. states.

Oil production 
The development of new technologies and adaptation in older technologies have made the exploited of the Peace River oil deposits possible. The primary methods are in situ using steam-assisted gravity drainage(SAGD) and Cold Heavy Oil Production with Sand (CHOPS).

Steam-assisted gravity drainage 

Whereas the Athabasca oil sands lie close enough to the surface that the sand can be scooped up in open-pit mines, and brought to a central location for processing, the Peace River deposits are considered too deep, and are exploited in situ using steam-assisted gravity drainage (SAGD) heating through the injection of steam, that reduces the bitumen's viscosity, allowing it to be pumped to the surface. According to PREDA,

Cold Heavy Oil Production with Sand 

Cold Heavy Oil Production with Sand (CHOPS) is one of the primary methods of production.

See also
 Athabasca oil sands
 Cold Lake oil sands
 Melville Island oil sands
 Wabasca oil sands
 List of articles about Canadian tar sands

References

Bituminous sands of Canada
Environment of Canada
Peace River Country